Milbertshofen (Central Bavarian: Muibatshofa), Am Riesenfeld and Am Hart (Central Bavarian: Am Hoart) are three boroughs situated in the north of Munich in Germany. Jointly, they form the city district 11 Milbertshofen-Am Hart. , the three boroughs had 76.255 inhabitants.

Location 
Milbertshofen-Am Hart is surrounded by Schwabing-Freimann (east), Schwabing-West (south), Neuhausen-Nymphenburg (southwest), Moosach and Feldmoching-Hasenbergl (west). North of it comes the municipality Oberschleißheim.

Description 
In Milbertshofen-Am Hart is the Olympiapark (with the 291-metre-high Olympiaturm Munich's tallest building, the Olympiahalle, Olympiastadion, Erinnerungsort Olympia-Attentat, Sea Life München, Olympic Village) and the BMW Museums (BMW Welt, BMW Group Classic, BMW Museum and BMW Tower). Other notable buildings include BMW FIZ, Knorr-Bremse headquarter, Bayerisches Landesamt für Verfassungsschutz, Euro-Industriepark, Mira shopping center and Gymnasium München Nord. Green Areas include: Petuelpark, Hartelholz and Panzerwiese. The Olympiapark is the location of the Zentrale Hochschulsportanlage, Spartan Race Sprint as well as Start- and Finish location of the Munich Marathon and Start of the Wings for Life World Run Munich.

 
Boroughs of Munich